Vasil Fyodaravich Yakusha (30 June 1958 – 24 November 2020) was a Belarusian rower who competed for the Soviet Union in the 1980 Summer Olympics and in the 1988 Summer Olympics. During most of his career, he was a single sculler.

He was born in Kyiv, Ukraine. At the 1980 Summer Olympics, he won the silver medal in the single sculls event. At the 1981 World Rowing Championships, he came eighth. At the 1982 World Rowing Championships, he won the silver medal. At the 1983 World Rowing Championships, he came fourth. He did not attend the 1984 Summer Olympics in California, USA, due to the Eastern Bloc boycott. At the 1985 World Rowing Championships, he came fourth. At the 1986 World Rowing Championships, he won the bronze medal.

At the 1988 Summer Olympics in Seoul, South Korea, he and his partner Oleksandr Marchenko won the bronze medal in the double sculls competition.

Yakusha died on 24 November 2020 at the age of 62.

References

1958 births
2020 deaths
Belarusian male rowers
Soviet male rowers
Olympic rowers of the Soviet Union
Rowers at the 1980 Summer Olympics
Rowers at the 1988 Summer Olympics
Olympic silver medalists for the Soviet Union
Olympic bronze medalists for the Soviet Union
Olympic medalists in rowing
Medalists at the 1988 Summer Olympics
Medalists at the 1980 Summer Olympics
World Rowing Championships medalists for the Soviet Union